'Democracy International, Inc., is a US-based organization that advises and assists, on behalf of governments, ministries and NGOs in democracy and governance projects, such as in the conduct of elections, election monitoring and building of multi-party systems.

Democracy International was co-founded by Eric Bjornlund and Glenn Cowan in 2003. It receives funding from the United States Agency for International Development (USAID), the US State Department, and other development partners.

Projects 
As of 2018, Democracy International has participated in more than 180 projects in more than 80 countries. Democracy International has active projects in Tunisia, Colombia, El Salvador, Bangladesh, South Sudan, and more.

References

External links
 
 

Democracy
Political organizations based in the United States